Leann Bowen is an American comedy writer. She has written for Ted Lasso, Dear White People. and I Love You, America.

Early life and education
Bowen was born in the Los Angeles area, and grew up in the San Fernando Valley. She is the daughter of the late Bobby Lee Bowen, who was a member of the Black Panther Party and Lillian Tamoria, whose family hails from Cavite, a province in the Philippines. Her parents split up when she was young. Bowen was raised by her mother and maternal grandparents, who instilled in her a strong work ethic.

Career
Bowen fine-tuned her writing and performing skills while working in improv and sketch comedy in the Los Angeles area.

Selected credits

Television

Writing

Awards and nominations
 Shared PGA Award, Outstanding Producer of Episodic Television, Comedy for Ted Lasso (2022)
 NAACP Image Award nomination, Outstanding Writing in a Comedy Series for Ted Lasso (2022)
 Shared WGA Award nomination, Comedy Series for Ted Lasso (2022)
 Shared two WGA Awards for Ted Lasso (2021)
 Shared WGA Award nomination, Comedy/Variety Sketch Series for I Love You, America (2019)

References

External links

Year of birth missing (living people)
African-American actresses
American actresses of Filipino descent
American comedy writers
American women comedians
Comedians from California
Living people
Writers from Los Angeles
African-American female comedians
21st-century American comedians
21st-century American actresses
21st-century American screenwriters
21st-century American women writers
Actresses from Los Angeles
Screenwriters from California
American television writers
American women television writers
21st-century African-American women writers
21st-century African-American writers
20th-century African-American people
20th-century African-American women
American writers of Filipino descent
Primetime Emmy Award winners